In mathematics, the prime-counting function is the function counting the number of prime numbers less than or equal to some real number x. It is denoted by (x) (unrelated to the number ).

Growth rate

Of great interest in number theory is the growth rate of the prime-counting function. It was conjectured in the end of the 18th century by Gauss and by Legendre to be approximately

where log is the natural logarithm, in the sense that

This statement is the prime number theorem. An equivalent statement is

where li is the logarithmic integral function. The prime number theorem was first proved in 1896 by Jacques Hadamard and by Charles de la Vallée Poussin independently, using properties of the Riemann zeta function introduced by Riemann in 1859. Proofs of the prime number theorem not using the zeta function or complex analysis were found around 1948 by Atle Selberg and by Paul Erdős (for the most part independently).

More precise estimates
In 1899, de la Vallée Poussin proved that

for some positive constant . Here,  is the big  notation.

For example, in 2002, Kevin Ford proved that

However,  is known to change sign infinitely many times. For a discussion of this, see Skewes' number.

Exact form

For  let  when  is a prime number, and  otherwise. Bernhard Riemann, in his work On the Number of Primes Less Than a Given Magnitude, proved that  is equal to

where

If the trivial zeros are collected and the sum is taken only over the non-trivial zeros ρ of the Riemann zeta function, then  may be approximated by

The Riemann hypothesis suggests that every such non-trivial zero lies along .

Table of (x), x / log x, and li(x)

The table shows how the three functions (x), x / log x and li(x) compare at powers of 10. See also, and

{| class="wikitable" style="text-align: right"
! x 
! (x)
! 
! 
! 
!
|-
| 10
| 4
| 0
| 2
| 2.500
| -8.57%
|-
| 102
| 25
| 3
| 5
| 4.000
|13.14%
|-
| 103
| 168
| 23
| 10
| 5.952
|13.83%
|-
| 104
| 1,229
| 143
| 17
| 8.137
|11.66%
|-
| 105
| 9,592
| 906
| 38
| 10.425
|9.45%
|-
| 106
| 78,498
| 6,116
| 130
| 12.739
|7.79%
|-
| 107
| 664,579
| 44,158
| 339
| 15.047
|6.64%
|-
| 108
| 5,761,455
| 332,774
| 754
| 17.357
|5.78%
|-
| 109
| 50,847,534
| 2,592,592
| 1,701
| 19.667
|5.10%
|-
| 1010
| 455,052,511
| 20,758,029
| 3,104
| 21.975
|4.56%
|-
| 1011
| 4,118,054,813
| 169,923,159
| 11,588
| 24.283
|4.13%
|-
| 1012
| 37,607,912,018
| 1,416,705,193
| 38,263
| 26.590
|3.77%
|-
| 1013
| 346,065,536,839
| 11,992,858,452
| 108,971
| 28.896
|3.47%
|-
| 1014
| 3,204,941,750,802
| 102,838,308,636
| 314,890
| 31.202
|3.21%
|-
| 1015
| 29,844,570,422,669
| 891,604,962,452
| 1,052,619
| 33.507
|2.99%
|-
| 1016
| 279,238,341,033,925
| 7,804,289,844,393
| 3,214,632
| 35.812
|2.79%
|-
| 1017
| 2,623,557,157,654,233
| 68,883,734,693,928
| 7,956,589
| 38.116
|2.63%
|-
| 1018
| 24,739,954,287,740,860
| 612,483,070,893,536
| 21,949,555
| 40.420
|2.48%
|-
| 1019
| 234,057,667,276,344,607
| 5,481,624,169,369,961
| 99,877,775
| 42.725
|2.34%
|-
| 1020
| 2,220,819,602,560,918,840
| 49,347,193,044,659,702
| 222,744,644
| 45.028
|2.22%
|-
| 1021
| 21,127,269,486,018,731,928
| 446,579,871,578,168,707
| 597,394,254
| 47.332
|2.11%
|-
| 1022
| 201,467,286,689,315,906,290
| 4,060,704,006,019,620,994
| 1,932,355,208
| 49.636
|2.02%
|-
| 1023
| 1,925,320,391,606,803,968,923
| 37,083,513,766,578,631,309
| 7,250,186,216
| 51.939
|1.93%
|-
| 1024
| 18,435,599,767,349,200,867,866
| 339,996,354,713,708,049,069
| 17,146,907,278
| 54.243
|1.84%
|-
| 1025
| 176,846,309,399,143,769,411,680
| 3,128,516,637,843,038,351,228
| 55,160,980,939
| 56.546
|1.77%
|-
| 1026
| 1,699,246,750,872,437,141,327,603
| 28,883,358,936,853,188,823,261
| 155,891,678,121
| 58.850
|1.70%
|-
|1027
|16,352,460,426,841,680,446,427,399
|267,479,615,610,131,274,163,365
|508,666,658,006
|61.153
|1.64%
|-
|1028
|157,589,269,275,973,410,412,739,598
|2,484,097,167,669,186,251,622,127
|1,427,745,660,374
|63.456
|1.58%
|-
|1029
|1,520,698,109,714,272,166,094,258,063
|23,130,930,737,541,725,917,951,446
|4,551,193,622,464
|65.759
|1.52%
|}

The value for (1024) was originally computed by J. Buethe, J. Franke, A. Jost, and T. Kleinjung assuming the Riemann hypothesis.
It was later verified unconditionally in a computation by D. J. Platt.
The value for (1025) is due to J. Buethe, J. Franke, A. Jost, and T. Kleinjung. 
The value for (1026) was computed by D. B. Staple. All other prior entries in this table were also verified as part of that work.

The value for 1027 was announced in 2015 by David Baugh and Kim Walisch.

The value for 1028 was announced in 2020 by David Baugh and Kim Walisch.

The value for 1029 was announced in 2022 by David Baugh and Kim Walisch.

Algorithms for evaluating (x) 

(where  denotes the floor function). This number is therefore equal to

The Meissel–Lehmer algorithm 

 

Given a natural number  if  and if  then

In 1959, Derrick Henry Lehmer extended and simplified Meissel's method.

where the sum actually has only finitely many nonzero terms. Let  denote an integer such that  and set  Then  and  when  Therefore,

The computation of  can be obtained this way:

where the sum is over prime numbers.

On the other hand, the computation of  can be done using the following rules:

Further improvements to this method were made by Lagarias, Miller, Odlyzko, Deléglise, and Rivat.

Other prime-counting functions

Other prime-counting functions are also used because they are more convenient to work with.

Riemann's prime-power counting function

Formally, we may define  by

where the variable  in each sum ranges over all primes within the specified limits.

We may also write

where  is the von Mangoldt function and

The Möbius inversion formula then gives

where  is the Möbius function.

Knowing the relationship between the logarithm of the Riemann zeta function and the von Mangoldt function , and using the Perron formula we have

Chebyshev's function 
The Chebyshev function weights primes or prime powers  by :

For ,

and

Formulas for prime-counting functions

Formulas for prime-counting functions come in two kinds: arithmetic formulas and analytic formulas. Analytic formulas for prime-counting were the first used to prove the prime number theorem. They stem from the work of Riemann and von Mangoldt, and are generally known as explicit formulas.

We have the following expression for ψ:

where

 

Here ρ are the zeros of the Riemann zeta function in the critical strip, where the real part of ρ is between zero and one. The formula is valid for values of x greater than one, which is the region of interest. The sum over the roots is conditionally convergent, and should be taken in order of increasing absolute value of the imaginary part. Note that the same sum over the trivial roots gives the last subtrahend in the formula.

For  we have a more complicated formula

Again, the formula is valid for x > 1, while ρ are the nontrivial zeros of the zeta function ordered according to their absolute value. The integral is equal to the series over the trivial zeros:

The first term li(x) is the usual logarithmic integral function; the expression li(xρ) in the second term should be considered as Ei(ρ log x), where Ei is the analytic continuation of the exponential integral function from negative reals to the complex plane with branch cut along the positive reals. 

Thus, Möbius inversion formula gives us

valid for x > 1, where

The latter series for it is known as Gram series.

Folkmar Bornemann proved, when assuming the conjecture that all zeros of the Riemann zeta function are simple, that

The sum over non-trivial zeta zeros in the formula for  describes the fluctuations of  while the remaining terms give the "smooth" part of prime-counting function, so one can use

Inequalities
Here are some useful inequalities for (x).

for x ≥ 17.

The left inequality holds for x ≥ 17 and the right inequality holds for x > 1.

Pierre Dusart proved in 2010:

Here are some inequalities for the nth  prime, pn. The upper bound is due to Rosser (1941), the lower one to Dusart (1999):

 for n ≥ 6.

The left inequality holds for n ≥ 2 and the right inequality holds for n ≥ 6.

An approximation for the nth prime number is

Ramanujan proved that the inequality

 

More recently, Dusart
 ,

The Riemann hypothesis

Specifically,

See also 
 Foias constant
 Bertrand's postulate
 Oppermann's conjecture
 Ramanujan prime

References

Notes

External links
Chris Caldwell, The Nth Prime Page at The Prime Pages.
Tomás Oliveira e Silva, Tables of prime-counting functions.

Analytic number theory
Prime numbers
Arithmetic functions